Nanuya Levu (pronounced ) is a privately owned island of the Yasawa Group in Fiji and the site of the Turtle Island Resort, a sustainable luxury resort and also the locale for the romance adventure film The Blue Lagoon (1980). The island is owned by American entrepreneur Richard Evanson.

Ba Province
Islands of Fiji
Yasawa Islands
Private islands of Fiji